Karwia is a village in the administrative district of Gmina Władysławowo, within Puck County, Pomeranian Voivodeship, in northern Poland, located on the south coast of the Baltic Sea. It is located within the ethnocultural region of Kashubia in the historic region of Pomerania. Prior to January 1, 2015 it was a part of the town Władysławowo.

The village has a population of 931.

Karwia was a royal village of the Polish Crown, administratively located in the Puck County in the Pomeranian Voivodeship.

References

Villages in Puck County
Populated coastal places in Poland
Seaside resorts in Poland